K23 may refer to:

 K-23 (Kansas highway)
 K23 (album), a 2022 album by Kenia Os
 "Conservati fedele", a concert aria by Wolfgang Amadeus Mozart
 Cooperstown-Westville Airport, in Otsego County, New York
 Honda K23 engine, an automobile engine
 , a corvette of the Swedish Navy
 Kandi K23, a Chinese microvan
 R-23 (missile), a Soviet missile
 Shintoku Station, in Hokkaidō, Japan